Duta Wacana Christian University (DWCU) or Universitas Kristen Duta Wacana (UKDW) is a private university in Yogyakarta, central of Java island, Indonesia. "Duta Wacana" in Sanskrit conveys an approximate meaning of being 'an ambassador for knowledge' or 'a messenger of the word'.

According to Webometrics World Universities' Ranking on the Web 2007, DWCU is ranked at 89th place among Southeast Asian universities.

DWCU is one of the 15 Indonesian universities in the SAP University Partnership Program.

History

A fusion of two theological academies – Jogjakarta Theological Academy, Yogyakarta and Balewijoto Theological School, Malang – on 31 October 1962, become the Duta Wacana Theological School. This school later became a university, with the name changed to the present Duta Wacana Christian University in 1985.

The Duta Wacana Christian University was established and run by the Foundation of Christian High Education of Duta Wacana.

Accreditation
Accreditation = A 
National Accreditation Board of Higher Education (BAN-PT) – Directory of Study Program. Queried with keyword "Duta Wacana", polished and translated.

Faculties and departments

Theology Faculty
Economic Faculty
Management Department
Accounting Department
Faculty of Architecture and Design
Architecture Department
Product Design Department
Faculty of Information Technology
Informatics Department
Information System Department
Faculty of Biotechnology
Environmental Biology Department

Gallery

References

External links

IKADUWA - Ikatan Alumni Duta Wacana (a beta version website for DWCU alumnus)
National Accreditation Board Of Higher Education (Badan Akreditasi Nasional Perguruan Tinggi) BAN-PT

Universities in Indonesia
Nondenominational Christian universities and colleges
Association of Christian Universities and Colleges in Asia
Education in Yogyakarta
Universities in the Special Region of Yogyakarta
Educational institutions established in 1962
1962 establishments in Indonesia
Private universities and colleges in Indonesia